Athenkosi Dlala (born 6 February 1998) is a South African professional soccer player who plays as a midfielder for University of Pretoria.

References

External links
 

1998 births
Living people
South African soccer players
Association football midfielders
SuperSport United F.C. players
University of Pretoria F.C. players
National First Division players
People from Bitou Local Municipality